The 2015 Circuit de la Sarthe (full name 2015 Circuit Cyclist Sarthe–Pays de Loire) was the 63rd edition of the Circuit de la Sarthe cycling stage race. It was run in the Sarthe department between 7 and 10 April 2015 and consisted of five stages, two of which took place on the same day. It was rated as a 2.1 event on the 2015 UCI Europe Tour. The race was won by the defending champion, Ramūnas Navardauskas. Navardauskas won the race by one second ahead of Manuele Boaro, thanks to six seconds won on the final stage at intermediate sprints.

Schedule
The race consisted of five stages. Two of these took place on the same day, with a short road stage in the morning and an individual time trial in the afternoon. The three flat stages were seen as opportunities for sprinters such as Nacer Bouhanni, who was without a victory to that point in 2015, while the time trial and the summit finish were expected to decide the general classification.

Stages

Stage 1 
7 April 2015 — Sablé-sur-Sarthe to Varades,

Stage 2a 
8 April 2015 — Varades to Angers,

Stage 2b 
8 April 2015 — Angers to Angers, individual time trial (ITT)

Stage 3 
9 April 2015 — Angers to Pré-en-Pail,

Stage 4 
10 April 2015 — L'Épau Abbey to Le Lude,

References

External links 
 

Circuit de la Sarthe
Circuit de la Sarthe
Circuit de la Sarthe (cycling)